Diatrype is a genus of crust fungi in the family Diatrypaceae. The widespread genus contains 59 species.

References

Xylariales